St. John's High School is a Catholic, independent, co-educational, day high school located in the suburb of Emerald Hill in Harare, Zimbabwe. It provides secondary education and A-levels.

History 
Three Dominican religious sisters opened the school in 1925 in a few sheds, to cater to the underprivileged children in the capital city. In 1939 a large building was constructed. In 1996 it ceased to be a boarding school and A-levels were added. After 2003 the A-levels followed the Zimbabwe ZIMSEC curriculum. A-levels are offered in Arts, Commercials, and Sciences.

Program 
As a Catholic school, its curriculum includes religious studies and some of its teachers remain sisters from the nearby convent.

Several St John's High School students and alumni have represented the junior provincial and national teams in sports such as hockey, basketball, swimming, and cricket, and internationally in Chess and Quiz. They won the December 2017 SADC NSQC quiz finals.

See also
List of schools in Zimbabwe

References

External links
  Official website

Schools in Harare
Private schools in Zimbabwe
Day schools in Zimbabwe
Catholic schools in Zimbabwe
Catholic secondary schools in Zimbabwe
Dominican schools in Zimbabwe
Educational institutions established in 1925
1925 establishments in Southern Rhodesia